Charles Didier (15 September 1805 – 7 March 1864) was a Swiss writer, poet and traveller.

Charles Didier followed classic studies in Geneva, where he published two collections of poems, La Harpe helvétique (1825) and Mélodies helvétiques (1825).

In 1827, attracted by the myth of Italy, he decided to undertake a trip to the peninsula, where he went as a tutor. In 1829 his travels took him to Sicily.

Didier's article, however, failed to arouse wide interest among the French public, just as a short and dense article by a certain Theil, which appeared in 1837 in the newspaper La Paix, in which the author, "had spoken about Leopardi wonderfully, but before a distracted audience and in a place that was too unliterary," failed to do so six years later.

Prevented by impending blindness, to take the road to the East, Charles Didier ended his life by committing suicide March 7, 1864 in Paris after long suffering.

Works  
Poetry
1825: La Harpe helvétique
1825: Mélodies helvétiques
 
Novels
1833: Rome souterraine
1838: Chavornay
1844–45 Caroline en Sicile
1859: Les amours d'Italie

Travels
1837: Une année en Espagne
1842: Campagne de Rome
1844: Promenade au Maroc
1856: Cinq cents lieues sur le Nil

He also wrote reports for the Revue encyclopédique and the Revue des deux Mondes.

Notes

External links 
 Charles Didier on Wikisource
 Charles Didier on Data.bnf.fr
 
 Rome souterraine (Tome I, online)
 Campagne de Rome, Jules Labitte libraire-éditeur, Paris, 1844 (online)

19th-century French poets
19th-century travel writers
Swiss travel writers
19th-century Swiss poets
Writers from Geneva
1805 births
1864 deaths
Swiss male poets
19th-century French male writers
French male non-fiction writers
1860s suicides